Eleidy María Aparicio Serrano is a pageant titleholder, born in Cabimas, Venezuela on September 9, 1983. She is the Miss Venezuela International titleholder for 2003, and was the official representative of Venezuela to the Miss International 2004 pageant held in Beijing, China, on October 16, 2004. Aparicio also represented her country in the World Coffee Queen 2004 beauty pageant, held in Houston, Texas, United States, on July 31, 2004, when she classified in the Top 6 finalists.

Aparicio competed in the national beauty pageant Miss Venezuela 2003 and obtained the title of Miss Venezuela International. She represented Costa Oriental.

References

External links
Miss Venezuela Official Website
Miss International Official Website

1983 births
Living people
Miss Venezuela International winners
Miss International 2004 delegates
People from Cabimas
University of Zulia alumni